LORAN-C transmitter Grangeville was the Whiskey secondary station of the Southeast U.S.  LORAN-C Chain ( GRI 7980). 
It used a transmission power of 800 kW.

Grangeville LORAN-C transmitter, was situated at Grangeville, Louisiana at 30°43'33" N, 90°49'43" W,(). 

The station was closed on February 8, 2010, as a budget cut.  The station, and all of the others, were considered to be obsolete with the general availability of GPS systems. The transmitter has been dismantled.

External links
 http://www.tech-service.net/loran/LORAN-1.XLS
 http://www.megapulse.com/chaininfo.html

Grangeville
Towers in Louisiana
2010 disestablishments in Louisiana